Ləkçıplaq (also, Lyakchiplak, Lyakchylpak, and Lyakchyplag) is a village and municipality in the Goychay Rayon of Azerbaijan.  It has a population of 5,328.

References 

Populated places in Goychay District